Rob Buchanan (born 13 May 1991) is an English former rugby union footballer who played
for Harlequins in the Gallagher Premiership. He played as a Hooker. He was a replacement for Harlequins in their 2011–12 Premiership final victory over Leicester Tigers.

Buchanan was selected for the England squad to face the Barbarians in the summer of 2014.

In May 2017 he was invited to a training camp with the senior England squad by Eddie Jones.

In June 2020 Buchanan announced his retirement from rugby to pursue other business interests.

References

External links 
 Harlequins profile

1991 births
Living people
Rugby union hookers
English rugby union players